The 1997 Sheffield Eagles season was the 14th season in the club's rugby league history and the second season in the Super League. Coached by John Kear, the Eagles competed in Super League II and finished in 8th place. The club also reached the fifth round of the Challenge Cup.

Table

Squad

References

External links
Sheffield Eagles - Rugby League Project

Sheffield Eagles
Sheffield Eagles
English rugby league club seasons